Hambergite (Be2BO3OH) is a beryllium borate mineral named after Swedish explorer and mineralogist Axel Hamberg (1863–1933). The mineral occurs as white or colorless orthorhombic crystals.

Occurrence
Hambergite occurs in beryllium bearing granite pegmatites as a rare accessory phase. It occurs associated with beryl, danburite, apatite, spodumene, zircon, fluorite, feldspar and quartz.

It was first described by mineralogist and geographer W. C. Brøgger in 1890. The type locality is Salbutangen, Helgeroa, Langesundsfjorden, Larvik, Vestfold, Norway where it was found in a pegmatite dike of nepheline syenite composition.

References

Bibliography 

Palache, P.; Berman H.; Frondel, C. (1960). "Dana's System of Mineralogy, Volume II: Halides, Nitrates, Borates, Carbonates, Sulfates, Phosphates, Arsenates, Tungstates, Molybdates, Etc. (Seventh Edition)" John Wiley and Sons, Inc., New York, pp. 370–372.
G. Diego Gatta; Garry J. McIntyre; Geoffrey Bromiley; Alessandro Guastoni; Fabrizio Nestola American Mineralogist (2012) 97 (11-12): 1891–1897. https://doi.org/10.2138/am.2012.4232 

Beryllium minerals
Orthorhombic minerals
Minerals in space group 61